Mandala was a Canadian R&B and soul band from the 1960s. The band was formed in 1965 in Toronto, Ontario as The Rogues and changed their name prior to their first Canadian Top 40 hit "Opportunity".

The band is best known for containing well-known Canadian guitarist Domenic Troiano who recorded with The James Gang and The Guess Who in the Seventies, and drummer Pentti Glan, who later played with Alice Cooper and Lou Reed (Glan was the drummer on Reed's 1974 live album, "Rock n Roll Animal").  The band also contained Roy Kenner, who later became the lead singer with the James Gang, both during and after the period when Troiano was lead guitarist with that band.

Biography

Early years
Mandala's origins can be traced back to The Rogues, the house band at the Club Bluenote in Toronto during the summer of 1964. Keyboard player Josef Chirowski (born March 2, 1947, in Germany), bass player Don Elliot (born December 8, 1944, in Toronto) and drummer Pentti "Whitey" Glan (born July 8, 1946, in Finland) had worked together previously in several outfits, most notably Whitey & The Roulettes, who also contained future Luke & The Apostles and McKenna Mendelson Mainline guitarist, Mike McKenna.

The band adopted the name The Rogues when singer George Olliver (born January 25, 1946, in Toronto) and former Robbie Lane & The Disciples guitarist Domenic Troiano (born Dominic Michaele Antonio Troiano, January 17, 1946, in Modugno, Italy, naturalized Canadian in 1955) joined in 1965. For a very brief period at the end of 1965, future Blood, Sweat & Tears singer David Clayton-Thomas also augmented the line up after parting with his previous support band, The Shays.

In the spring of 1966, The Rogues (minus Clayton-Thomas) briefly became The Five Rogues and consolidated their local reputation with regular appearances on the city's vibrant club scene, playing at venues like the Hawk's Nest, the Club El Mocambo and the Gogue Inn.

One show at the Gogue Inn, advertised in the Toronto Telegram's "After Four" section for May 25, 1966, found the group opening for Wilson Pickett alongside another local group, R K & The Associates, who featured future Mandala singer Roy Kenner. During this hectic period, the band also performed throughout Ontario, appearing at notable venues like the Whitby Arena and Oshawa's Jubilee Pavilion.  Around this time, the group also recorded two tracks as demos – "I Can't Hold Out No Longer" and "I'll Make It Up To You".

Five Rogues become Mandala
In mid-September 1966, the group's manager, Rafael Markowitz (aka Randy Martin), a former TV clown, sensed a change in the music scene and decided to reinvent the group's image and name. Mandala is a symbol (a circle within a circle within a circle), which is used by Buddhist monks as an aid to contemplation.

Markowitz envisioned the band as being a channel for the audience to release its emotions and the newly named outfit, decked in pinstripe, gangster-style suits and aided by strobe lights, returned to the Toronto scene in early October with its "Soul Crusade", which was met with mass hysteria.

Hollywood
The US market soon beckoned and in late November, Mandala made a brief exploratory trip to Los Angeles performing for four nights at the Whisky a Go Go. While there, the band played three weekends at the Hullabaloo where they attracted 1,400 fans by word of mouth. On the way home, the group stopped off in Chicago and recorded Troiano's "Opportunity" at Chess Studios, with The Dells providing backing vocals. Issued as Mandala's debut single on Decca's subsidiary label, KR, "Opportunity" swiftly climbed up Toronto's CHUM Chart, peaking at #3 on February 20, 1967.

After gigging extensively in the Toronto area throughout the early part of 1967, Mandala travelled to New York in early March for an extended engagement at Steve Paul's The Scene, alongside folk singer/songwriter Eric Andersen, the shows running from March 6 to April 2.

Murray the K's Easter Rock Extravaganza
While in New York, Mandala also participated in Murray the K's Easter Rock Extravaganza, which was held at RKO Theatre in Manhattan from March 25 to April 4 and also featured The Blues Project, Cream, The Who, Wilson Pickett, Jim and Jean, The Chicago Loop and Mitch Ryder & the Detroit Wheels among others. Following the show, the band joined Wilson Pickett and Mitch Ryder and The Detroit Wheels for a number of dates in the New York area before returning to Toronto in early April.

That same month, KR released a second single, "Give & Take", which made #21 on the CHUM chart. The group also began work on its "Soul Crusade" album at Toronto Sound but internal differences ground the sessions to a halt.

Mandala returned to New York several times over the next few months, performing at Steve Paul's The Scene from April 25-May 5 and for a one-off show on July 18. They also travelled to Montreal to perform at the Garden of Stars from July 30-August 5 during Expo.

However, internal differences were starting to pull the group apart. Shortly after another short trip to New York to play Steve Paul's The Scene on September 27, 1967, singer George Olliver left to form his own band. Chirowski also departed at this point to work briefly for Canadian Pacific Railways during the day and perform with The Power Project in the evenings.

Roy Kenner and Atlantic Records
A new line up of the band featuring singer Roy Kenner (born  January 14, 1948, in Toronto) and keyboard player Henry Babraj, from Roy Kenner & The Associates, made its public debut at the Roost in Ottawa on October 8, 1967.

The following month, Mandala embarked on their fourth US tour, kicking off with a show at the Cheetah in Hollywood. The tour included an appearance at the Swing Auditorium in San Bernardino, California on November 13 alongside Buffalo Springfield and The Yellow Payges.

In early 1968, Atlantic Records chief Ahmet Ertegun acted on a tip from producer Phil Spector and bought the group's contract from Decca. With the green light to record, Mandala laid down six tracks at Atlantic Studios, New York in February, including the Arif Mardin produced single "Love It-is", which reached #9 on the CHUM chart when it was released in July.

Two months later, the band completed sessions for its long-awaited debut album, "Soul Crusade" and then remained in the States to tour before returning to Toronto in June, around which time Henry Babraj appears to have left the group.  One or more local Toronto players may have been used for local and regional and U.S. shows but Babraj's permanent replacement was Hugh Sullivan from Mr Paul & The Blues Council, who joined Mandala in the Bahamas. Soon afterwards, the group recorded at least two Coca-Cola commercials.

As the group seemed on the verge of a major breakthrough disaster struck. In October 1968, Don Elliot was involved in a serious car accident and was forced to leave Mandala leaving the rest of the group to complete a Canadian tour with Sullivan covering bass on keyboards.

More bad news lay in store. The band's final single, "You Got Me", failed to chart while sales for the "Soul Crusade" album were disappointing. Shortly after appearing at the Detroit Pop Festival and the Grand Rapids Pop Festival in Michigan during April 1969, the band recruited bass player Prakash John from The Stone Soul Children but the end was in sight and on June 1, 1969, Mandala played their final show at the Hawk's Nest in Toronto.

Aftermath
Bass player Don Elliot subsequently joined Leigh Ashford and then played in Milestone in the early Seventies.

After fronting his group, The Soul Children, original singer George Olliver recorded and toured with Natural Gas in the late Sixties. He then fronted George Olliver and Friends, which also contained former Mandala member, Barry Hutt.

Keyboard player Josef Chirowski meanwhile played with various Toronto bands before becoming a member of the highly respected rock band, Crowbar.

Hugh Sullivan briefly played with Merryweather while Kenner, Troiano, Glan and John regrouped as Bush and recorded a lone album in 1971. Hugh sadly took his own life in 1977.

Kenner and Troiano subsequently recorded with The James Gang in 1972–1974, while Chirowski, Glan and John became notable session and touring musicians, playing with the likes of Alice Cooper and Lou Reed, among others.  Troiano later developed a successful solo career, which included Kenner at various points.  Kenner stayed in and around Toronto, developing an expertise in advertising vocals.  John established the Toronto-based rhythm and blues band, The Lincolns, which continues playing today.

Domenic Troiano died of cancer in 2005. Pentti Glan died in 2017.

Discography
 45 – "Opportunity" / "Lost Love" (KR 0115) – 1967
 45 – "Give and Take" / "From Toronto '67" (KR 0121) – 1967
 45 – "Love-Itis" / "Mellow Carmello Palumbo" (Atlantic 2512) – 1968
 45 – "You Got Me" / "Help Me" (Atlantic 2576) – 1968
 LP – Soul Crusade (Atlantic SD 8184) – 1968

References
Citations

Sources
 Article on Mandala at Classic rock page 
 "Los Angeles 'Sun-set' raves over The Mandala", Toronto Daily Star, December 12, 1966, page 18
 "The Soul Sound of The Mandala", Canadian Teen Magazine, January–February 1967.
 "This time, only a few shrieks for the Mandala", Toronto Daily Star, June 28, 1967, page 36
 RPM Weekly magazine, week starting November 14, 1967.
 The Toronto Telegram's "After Four" section on Thursdays advertised live gigs for the forthcoming week.

Musical groups established in 1965
Musical groups disestablished in 1970
Musical groups from Toronto
Canadian rhythm and blues music groups
1965 establishments in Ontario
1970 disestablishments in Ontario